Pitambar Pant was an Indian independence activist, civil service officer and writer, best known for his contributions for the establishment of the Central Statistics Office and for changing Indian system of measurement to metric system. He served as the secretary to Jawaharlal Nehru, the then prime minister of India and headed the perspective planning division of the Planning Commission of India. He was also the author of a number of books on socialist economics. The Government of India awarded him the Padma Bhushan, the third highest civilian award, in 1973.

Biography
Pitamber Pant completed a master's degree in physics during which time he was involved in the Quit India movement and was imprisoned by the British. This gave him an opportunity to get acquainted with Jawaharlal Nehru, J. B. Kripalani and several other independence activists and he worked as a secretary to Nehru, while in jail. After the Indian independence, Nehru, who had been impressed by Pant's preoccupation with economic planning, asked him to meet Prasanta Chandra Mahalanobis, an applied statistician of repute, and the two became friends and long-time associates. Pant accompanied Mahalanobis in the latter's overseas trips. Later, he joined Indian civil service and was entrusted with the task of studying the system of measurement. After a detailed study, he submitted a report, proposing the metric system which was reported to have influenced the government's decision to adopt metric system. Later, he was entrusted with a study on statistical system and the report Pant prepared, along with N. T. Mathew under the title, Report on the Present Statistical Organization in Provinces and States in 1949 served as the blueprint for the establishment of the Central Statistical Unit, which, over time, evolved into the present-day Central Statistics Office.

In 1956, the Planning Commission of India as a staff member, taking up the position to the secretary of the Chairman, (Nehru, as the prime minister, was the chairman) and headed the manpower planning division of the commission. In this position, he prepared several reports concerning Indian labor force, utilization of professional manpower, and forecasting of manpower requirement and also headed the Indian Statistical Institute. In 1958, he moved to the newly created perspective planning division as its head and held the position till he retired from official service in 1970. During this period, he served as a member of the Fourth Five Year Plan. After retirement, he was selected as the chairman of the National Committee on Environmental Planning and Coordination (NCEPC) but his tenure was short-lived due to his death on February 26, 1973, succumbing to prolonged illness.

Pant was the author of a number of books, including Memorandum on the introduction of metric system in India, Manpower and educational development in India, 1961-1968 and Urbanization and the long-range strategy of economic development. The Government of India awarded him with the Padma Bhushan, the fourth highest civilian honor, in 1973, shortly before his death. The Ministry of Environment and Forests have instituted an annual award, Pitambar Pant National Environment Fellowship Award, in his honor. Economic survey of India (FY 2020-21) has mentioned his advocacy for the idea of "minimum needs".

Bibliography

See also

 Ministry of Statistics and Programme Implementation
 NITI Aayog

References

Further reading

External links
 
 

Recipients of the Padma Bhushan in civil service
Indian Administrative Service officers
Year of birth missing
1973 deaths
Indian independence activists
Members of the Planning Commission of India